Jani Tuominen (born March 16, 1971) is a Finnish former ice hockey centre.

Tuominen played 17 games for Lukko during the 1996–97 SM-liiga season, scoring two goals and one assist. He also played in Norway's Eliteserien for Frisk Asker, France's Élite Ligue for Ducs d'Angers and Brûleurs de loups, Italy's Serie A for HC Pustertal Wölfe, HC Torinovalpe and Milano Vipers and the United Kingdom's Elite Ice Hockey League for the London Racers.

References

External links

1971 births
Living people
Bisons de Neuilly-sur-Marne players
Brest Albatros Hockey players
Brûleurs de Loups players
Ducs d'Angers players
Finnish ice hockey centres
Frisk Asker Ishockey players
London Racers players
Lukko players
Olofströms IK players
HC Pustertal Wölfe players
Sportspeople from Turku
TuTo players